These are the official results of the Women's 4 × 100 m Relay event at the 1996 Summer Olympics in Atlanta, Georgia. There were 22 nations competing.

Medalists

* Athletes who participated in the heats only and received medals.

Results

Heats
Qualification: First 2 in each heat (Q) and the next 2 fastest (q) qualified to the final.

Final

See also
Men's 4 × 100 m Relay

References

External links
 Official Report
 Results

R
Relay foot races at the Olympics
1996 in women's athletics
Women's events at the 1996 Summer Olympics